The 77th Academy Awards ceremony, presented by the Academy of Motion Picture Arts and Sciences (AMPAS), took place on February 27, 2005, at the Kodak Theatre in Hollywood, Los Angeles beginning at 5:30 p.m. PST / 8:30 p.m. EST. During the ceremony, AMPAS presented Academy Awards (commonly referred to as the Oscars) in 24 categories honoring films released in 2004. The ceremony, televised in the United States by ABC, was produced by Gil Cates and was directed by Louis J. Horvitz. Actor Chris Rock hosted the show for the first time. Two weeks earlier in a ceremony at The Ritz-Carlton Huntington Hotel & Spa in Pasadena, California held on February 12, the Academy Awards for Technical Achievement were presented by host Scarlett Johansson.

Million Dollar Baby won four awards, including Best Picture. Other winners included The Aviator with five awards, The Incredibles and Ray with two, and Born into Brothels: Calcutta's Red Light Kids, Eternal Sunshine of the Spotless Mind, Finding Neverland, Lemony Snicket's A Series of Unfortunate Events, Mighty Times: The Children's March, The Motorcycle Diaries, Ryan, The Sea Inside, Sideways, Spider-Man 2, and Wasp with one. The telecast garnered over 42 million viewers in the United States alone.

Winners and nominees 

The nominees for the 77th Academy Awards were announced on January 25, 2005, at the Samuel Goldwyn Theater in Beverly Hills, California, by Frank Pierson, president of the academy, and actor Adrien Brody. The Aviator received the most nominations with eleven; Finding Neverland and Million Dollar Baby tied for second with seven nominations each.

The winners were announced during the awards ceremony on February 27, 2005. At age 74, Clint Eastwood became the oldest winner for Best Director in Oscar history. With his latest unsuccessful nomination for directing The Aviator, nominee Martin Scorsese joined Robert Altman, Clarence Brown, Alfred Hitchcock, and King Vidor as the most nominated individuals in the Best Director category without a single win at the time. Best Actor winner Jamie Foxx became the second actor and tenth individual overall to earn two acting nominations in the same year. By virtue of her portrayal of Katharine Hepburn, Best Supporting Actress winner Cate Blanchett was the first performer to portray a previous Oscar winner. "Al otro lado del río" from The Motorcycle Diaries became the second song with non-English lyrics to win Best Original Song. The first to achieve this feat was the titular song from the 1960 Greek film Never on Sunday at the 33rd Academy Awards.

Awards

Winners are listed first, highlighted in boldface, and indicated with a double dagger.
{| class=wikitable
|-
| valign="top" width="50%" |

Million Dollar Baby – Clint Eastwood, Albert S. Ruddy and Tom Rosenberg, producers The Aviator – Michael Mann and Graham King, producers
 Finding Neverland – Richard N. Gladstein and Nellie Bellflower, producers
 Ray – Taylor Hackford, Stuart Benjamin and Howard Baldwin, producers
 Sideways – Michael London, producer
| valign="top" width="50%" |Clint Eastwood – Million Dollar Baby
 Martin Scorsese – The Aviator
 Taylor Hackford – Ray
 Alexander Payne – Sideways
 Mike Leigh – Vera Drake
|-
| valign="top" |

Jamie Foxx – Ray as Ray Charles
 Don Cheadle – Hotel Rwanda as Paul Rusesabagina
 Johnny Depp – Finding Neverland as J. M. Barrie
 Leonardo DiCaprio – The Aviator as Howard Hughes
 Clint Eastwood – Million Dollar Baby as Frankie Dunn
| valign="top" |

Hilary Swank – Million Dollar Baby as Margaret "Maggie" Fitzgerald
 Annette Bening – Being Julia as Julia Lambert
 Catalina Sandino Moreno – Maria Full of Grace as María Álvarez
 Imelda Staunton – Vera Drake as Vera Rose Drake
 Kate Winslet – Eternal Sunshine of the Spotless Mind as Clementine Kruczynski
|-
| valign="top" |

Morgan Freeman – Million Dollar Baby as Eddie "Scrap-Iron" Dupris
 Alan Alda – The Aviator as Owen Brewster
 Thomas Haden Church – Sideways as Jack Cole
 Jamie Foxx – Collateral as Max Durocher
 Clive Owen – Closer as Larry Gray
| valign="top" |

Cate Blanchett – The Aviator as Katharine Hepburn
 Laura Linney – Kinsey as Clara McMillen
 Virginia Madsen – Sideways as Maya Randall
 Sophie Okonedo – Hotel Rwanda as Tatiana Rusesabagina
 Natalie Portman – Closer as Alice Ayres/Jane Jones
|-
| valign="top" |

Eternal Sunshine of the Spotless Mind – Charlie Kaufman, Michel Gondry and Pierre Bismuth The Aviator – John Logan
 Hotel Rwanda – Terry George and Keir Pearson
 The Incredibles – Brad Bird
 Vera Drake – Mike Leigh
| valign="top" |Sideways – Alexander Payne and Jim Taylor based on the novel by Rex Pickett Before Sunset – Richard Linklater, Julie Delpy, Ethan Hawke and Kim Krizan based on characters created by Richard Linklater and Kim Krizan for the film Before Sunrise
 Finding Neverland – David Magee based on the play The Man Who Was Peter Pan by Allan Knee
 Million Dollar Baby – Paul Haggis based on stories from Rope Burns by F.X. Toole
 The Motorcycle Diaries – José Rivera based on the books Con el Che por America Latina by Alberto Granado and The Motorcycle Diaries by Che Guevara
|-
| valign="top" |The Incredibles – Brad Bird Shark Tale – Bill Damaschke
 Shrek 2 – Andrew Adamson
| valign="top" |The Sea Inside (Spain) in Spanish, Catalan and Galician – Alejandro AmenábarAs It Is in Heaven (Sweden) in Swedish – Kay Pollak
The Chorus (France) in French – Christophe Barratier
Downfall (Germany) in German – Oliver Hirschbiegel
Yesterday (South Africa) in Zulu – Darrell Roodt
|-
| valign="top" |Born into Brothels: Calcutta's Red Light Kids – Ross Kauffman and Zana Briski The Story of the Weeping Camel – Luigi Falorni and Byambasuren Davaa
 Super Size Me – Morgan Spurlock
 Tupac: Resurrection – Lauren Lazin and Karolyn Ali
 Twist of Faith – Kirby Dick and Eddie Schmidt
| valign="top" |Mighty Times: The Children's March – Robert Hudson and Robert Houston Autism Is a World – Gerardine Wurzburg
 The Children of Leningradsky – Hanna Polak and Andrzej Celinski
 Hardwood – Hubert Davis and Erin Faith Young
 Sister Rose's Passion – Oren Jacoby and Steve Kalafer
|-
| valign="top" |Wasp – Andrea Arnold 7:35 in the Morning – Nacho Vigalondo
 Everything in This Country Must – Gary McKendry
 Little Terrorist – Ashvin Kumar
 Two Cars, One Night – Taika Waititi and Ainsley Gardiner
| valign="top" |Ryan – Chris Landreth Birthday Boy – Sejong Park and Andrew Gregory
 Gopher Broke – Jeff Fowler and Tim Miller
 Guard Dog – Bill Plympton
 Lorenzo – Mike Gabriel and Baker Bloodworth
|-
| valign="top" |Finding Neverland – Jan A. P. Kaczmarek
 Harry Potter and the Prisoner of Azkaban – John Williams
 Lemony Snicket's A Series of Unfortunate Events – Thomas Newman
 The Passion of the Christ – John Debney
 The Village – James Newton Howard
| valign="top" |

"Al otro lado del río" from The Motorcycle Diaries – Music and Lyrics by Jorge Drexler
 "Accidentally in Love" from Shrek 2 – Music by Adam Duritz, Charlie Gillingham, Jim Bogios, David Immerglück, Matt Malley and David Bryson; Lyrics by Adam Duritz and Dan Vickrey
 "Believe" from The Polar Express – Music and Lyrics by Glen Ballard and Alan Silvestri
 "Learn to Be Lonely" from The Phantom of the Opera – Music by Andrew Lloyd Webber; Lyrics by Charles Hart
 "Look to Your Path" from The Chorus – Music by Bruno Coulais; Lyrics by Christophe Barratier
|-
| valign="top" |

The Incredibles – Michael Silvers and Randy Thom
 The Polar Express – Randy Thom and Dennis Leonard
 Spider-Man 2 – Paul N. J. Ottosson

| valign="top" |

Ray – Scott Millan, Greg Orloff, Bob Beemer and Steve Cantamessa The Aviator – Tom Fleischman and Petur Hliddal
 The Incredibles – Randy Thom, Gary Rizzo and Doc Kane
 The Polar Express – Randy Thom, Tom Johnson, Dennis S. Sands and William B. Kaplan
 Spider-Man 2 – Kevin O'Connell, Greg P. Russell, Jeffrey J. Haboush and Joseph Geisinger
|-
| valign="top" |The Aviator – Art Direction: Dante Ferretti; Set Decoration: Francesca Lo Schiavo Finding Neverland – Art Direction: Gemma Jackson; Set Decoration: Trisha Edwards
 Lemony Snicket's A Series of Unfortunate Events – Art Direction: Rick Heinrichs; Set Decoration: Cheryl Carasik
 The Phantom of the Opera – Art Direction: Anthony Pratt; Set Decoration: Celia Bobak
 A Very Long Engagement – Art Direction and Set Decoration: Aline Bonetto
| valign="top" |The Aviator – Robert Richardson House of Flying Daggers – Zhao Xiaoding
 The Passion of the Christ – Caleb Deschanel
 The Phantom of the Opera – John Mathieson
 A Very Long Engagement – Bruno Delbonnel
|-
| valign="top" |Lemony Snicket's A Series of Unfortunate Events – Valli O'Reilly and Bill Corso The Passion of the Christ – Keith VanderLaan and Christien Tinsley
 The Sea Inside – Jo Allen and Manolo García
| valign="top" |The Aviator – Sandy Powell Finding Neverland – Alexandra Byrne
 Lemony Snicket's A Series of Unfortunate Events – Colleen Atwood
 Ray – Sharen Davis
 Troy – Bob Ringwood
|-
| valign="top" |The Aviator – Thelma Schoonmaker Collateral – Jim Miller and Paul Rubell
 Finding Neverland – Matt Chessé
 Million Dollar Baby – Joel Cox
 Ray – Paul Hirsch
| valign="top" |Spider-Man 2'' – John Dykstra, Scott Stokdyk, Anthony LaMolinara and John Frazier
 Harry Potter and the Prisoner of Azkaban – Roger Guyett, Tim Burke, John Richardson and Bill George
 I, Robot – John Nelson, Andrew R. Jones, Erik Nash and Joe Letteri
|}

Academy Honorary Award
Sidney Lumet  In recognition of his brilliant services to screenwriters, performers and the art of the motion picture.

Jean Hersholt Humanitarian Award
Roger Mayer

Films with multiple nominations and awards

The following 22 films received multiple nominations:

The following four films received multiple awards:

Presenters and performers
The following individuals, listed in order of appearance, presented awards or performed musical numbers.

 Presenters 

Performers

 Ceremony information 

Opting for a younger face in an attempt to increase viewership, while renewing interest with the nominated films, producer Gil Cates selected actor and comedian Chris Rock to host the 2005 ceremony. Cates explained his decision to hire Rock for the telecast in a press release saying, "I am a huge fan of Chris Rock. He always makes me laugh and he always has something interesting to say. Chris represents the best of the new generation of comics. Having him host the Oscars is terrific. I can't wait." By virtue of his selection, Rock became the first African American man to solo host the gala.

Nearly a month before the ceremony Rock told Josh Wolk of Entertainment Weekly, "Come on, it's a fashion show. No one performs; it's not like a music show. What straight black man sits there and watches the Oscars? Show me one." Political blogger Matt Drudge later reported that several anonymous AMPAS members wanted Rock fired from his hosting job as a result of the comments. Nevertheless, producer Cates issued a statement defending the host saying, "Chris' comments are meant to be humorous digs at a show that some people, obviously including Chris himself, think may be a bit too stuffy." Furthermore, Wolk dismissed any controversy regarding Rock's comments and that Drudge exaggerated the host's comments. GLAAD Executive Director Joan Garry also issue a statement in light of the controversy stating, "Chris Rock isn't making fun of gays – he's poking fun at the Oscars." Rock appeared on The Tonight Show with Jay Leno the Monday before the ceremony to clarify his comments. When Leno asked about the statement, Rock replied "I did not say that. I said only gay people watch the Tonys." However, he reiterated, "I really don't know any straight men who aren't in show business that have ever watched the Oscars."

Notable changes were made to give the ceremony a sleek, interactive look while shortening the length of the ceremony. Cates announced that in certain categories, all five nominees would be up onstage prior to the announcement of the award. In other instances, the actor or actress would present the award in the audience. In addition, production designer Roy Christopher designed an technologically ambitious stage for the telecast that both saluted the past while look toward the future. The set prominently featured 26 high-definition video monitors floating over the first twelve rows of the audience and a 40-foot LED screen situated beneath a layer of plexiglass on the stage floor. Both screens were used display images of previous Oscar appearances as presenters took the stage or random film clips during several commercial breaks. A gold rod featuring 23 different life-sized Oscar statuettes spiraling upward was placed at center stage.

Several other people were involved with the production of the ceremony. Film composer and musician Bill Conti served as musical director of the ceremony. AMPAS graphics designer Brett Davidson designed the official ceremony poster consisting of a profile of the Oscar statuette in front of four neon-colored squares. Freelance producer Cochise and media firm Dig and Media Island released a trailer shown in movie theaters nationwide promoting the ceremony featuring clips from past Oscar ceremonies against the four squares backdrop in the aforementioned poster. The trailer featured the song "Hey Mama" by The Black Eyed Peas. Two-time Oscar-winning actor Dustin Hoffman narrated the opening montage highlighting the evolution of the movies.

Box office performance of nominated films
When the nominations were announced on January 25, the field of Best Picture nominees did not include a bona fide blockbuster at the U.S. box office. It was the first time since 1986 that none of the five films in that category were among the top ten releases in box office prior to the nominations announcement. Furthermore, before the ceremony, all five films sold the lowest cumulative number of tickets sold since 1984. Ray was the highest-grossing film among the Best Picture nominees with $73 million in domestic box office receipts. The film was followed by The Aviator ($58.4 million), Finding Neverland ($32.7 million), Sideways ($32.4 million), and finally Million Dollar Baby ($8.4 million). The combined gross of the five Best Picture nominees when the Oscars were announced was $205 million with an average gross of $41.3 million per film.

Among the rest of the top 50 releases of 2004 in U.S. box office before the nominations, 44 nominations went to 14 films on the list. Only Shrek 2 (1st), The Incredibles (4th), Shark Tale (11th), Collateral (22nd), Ray (37th),  and The Aviator (49th) were nominated for Best Picture, Best Animated Feature, directing, acting, or screenwriting. The other top 50 box office hits that earned the nominations were Spider-Man 2 (2nd), The Passion of the Christ (3rd), Harry Potter and the Prisoner of Azkaban (5th), The Polar Express (10th), I, Robot (12th), Troy (13th), Lemony Snicket's A Series of Unfortunate Events (18th), and The Village (20th).

Jude Law joke
During his monologue, host Rock joked, "Clint Eastwood's a star, OK? Tobey Maguire's just a boy in tights," He also added, "You want Tom Cruise and all you can get is Jude Law? Wait. You want Russell Crowe and all you can get is Colin Farrell? Wait. Alexander is not Gladiator." In response, Sean Penn rebutted Rock's remarks praising Law as one of his generation's "finest actors". Over a year later, Law expressed his anger toward Rock in The New York Times telling columnist Craig Modderno, "At first I laughed because I didn't think he knew who I was. Then I got angry as his remarks became personal. My friends were livid. It's unfortunate I had five or six films come out at the same time."

Scrapped Robin Williams song
Robin Williams initially wanted to sing a humorous song written by Marc Shaiman and Scott Wittman during the presentation of the Best Animated Feature award satirizing the controversy regarding Focus on the Family and a music video sponsored by We Are Family Foundation featuring animated characters such as SpongeBob SquarePants singing the song "We Are Family". The song contained lyrics  such as "Pinocchio's had his nose done! Sleeping Beauty is popping pills!/ The Three Little Pigs ain't kosher! Betty Boop works Beverly Hills!" However, Cates and ABC officials deemed the song overly vulgar and offensive for the telecast and was dropped altogether after writers Shaiman and Wittman had trouble rewriting more appropriate lyrics. Williams eventually presented the Best Animated Feature award as scheduled, but silently mocked the debacle by entering the stage with duct tape over his mouth before speaking.

Critical reviews
The show received a mixed reception from media publications. Some media outlets were more critical of the show and Rock's performance as host. USA Today television critic Robert Bianco wrote, "Loud, snide and dismissive, he wasn't just a disappointment; he ranks up there with the worst hosts ever." He also called the decision to have several nominees of several technical categories stand on stage embarrassing and disrespectful. Columnist Robert. P. Lawrence of the San Diego Union Tribune commented, "It was a frustratingly average, three-hour-12-minute exhibition of mutual admiration in the inimitable Hollywood style." He later said that despite Rock's edgy and provocative opening, his humor and energy diminished as the night wore on. Vince Horiuchi of The Salt Lake Tribune wrote of Rock's  performance, "He was bound by stale jokes (none of the winners "tested positive for steroids"), a rigid opening monologue (he didn't even make reference to his prior controversial comments about the Oscars), and tired comedy bits (Rock playing like Catherine Zeta-Jones with Adam Sandler)." He also described the cast and production of the ceremony as "moribund" and "clumsy".

Other media outlets received the broadcast more positively. Film critic Roger Ebert noted that Rock "opened on a high-energy quick-talking note" He also added, "Chris Rock hit a home run with his opening monologue, which was surprisingly pointed, topical, and not shy of controversy." Television critic Frazier Moore commented that Rock's performance was a "needed pick-me-up, presiding over the broadcast with saucy finesse." He added, "In sum, the broadcast felt brisk, though not rushed. It felt modern and refreshingly free of chronic self-importance."  Brian Lowry of Variety gave an average review of Rock but remarked, "For all the hand-wringing about the awards descending into the muck, the 77th Academy Awards proved a classy affair, with precious little red meat to satiate Hollywood bashers."

Ratings and reception
The American telecast on ABC drew an average of 42.14 million people over its length, which was a 3% decrease from the previous year's ceremony. The show also drew lower Nielsen ratings compared to the two previous ceremonies with 25.4 of households watching over a 38 share. It also drew a lower 18–49 demo rating with a 15.1 rating over a 34 share among viewers in that demographic.

In Memoriam
The annual In Memoriam tribute was presented by actress Annette Bening. Musician Yo-Yo Ma performed during the segment.

Ronald Reagan – Actor
Peter Ustinov - Actor
Carrie Snodgress - Actress
Dan Petrie Sr. – Director
David Raksin – Composer
Fay Wray - Actress
Phil Gersh – Agent
Elmer Bernstein – Composer
Carole Eastman – Writer
Frank Thomas – Animator
Russ Meyer – Director
Jerry Orbach - Actor, singer
Ralph E. Winters – Editor
Robert E. Thompson – Writer
Howard Keel - Actor, singer
Janet Leigh - Actress
Christopher Reeve - Actor
Ossie Davis - Actor
Jerry Bick – Producer
Mercedes McCambridge - Actress
William Sackheim – Writer, producer
Ed Di Gullio – Inventor
Nelson Gidding – Writer
Paul Winfield - Actor
Philippe de Broca – Director
Jerry Goldsmith – Composer
Rodney Dangerfield - Stand-up-comic, actor
Virginia Mayo - Actress
Tony Randall - Actor, comedian
Marlon Brando - Actor

A special tribute to five-time host Johnny Carson was presented by host Chris Rock with previous presenter Whoopi Goldberg discussing Carson's legacy to television and the Academy Awards in the segment. Later on in the broadcast, Best Actor winner Jamie Foxx briefly eulogized singer and musician Ray Charles, who died in June 2004, during his acceptance speech.

See also

 11th Screen Actors Guild Awards
 25th Golden Raspberry Awards
 47th Grammy Awards
 57th Primetime Emmy Awards
 58th British Academy Film Awards
 59th Tony Awards
 62nd Golden Globe Awards
 List of submissions to the 77th Academy Awards for Best Foreign Language Film

References

Bibliography

External links

Official websites
 Academy Awards Official website
 The Academy of Motion Picture Arts and Sciences Official website
 Oscar's Channel at YouTube (run by the Academy of Motion Picture Arts and Sciences)

News resources
 Oscars 2005 BBC News
 Oscars 2005 Boston.com
 Academy Awards coverage CNN
 The Academy Awards 2005 People''

Analysis
 2004 Academy Awards Winners and History Filmsite
 Academy Awards, USA: 2005 Internet Movie Database

Other resources
 

Academy Awards ceremonies
2004 film awards
2005 in American cinema
2005 in Los Angeles
February 2005 events in the United States
Academy
Television shows directed by Louis J. Horvitz